The 1997 Canisius Golden Griffins football team represented Canisius College in the 1997 NCAA Division I-AA football season. The Golden Griffins offense scored 131 points while the defense allowed 205 points.

Schedule

References

Canisius
Canisius Golden Griffins football seasons
Canisius Golden Griffins football